Graham Foster was an American football player and coach. He served as the head football coach at Beloit College in Beloit, Wisconsin in 1908, compiling a record of 1–4–1. In the early days of college football, Foster enjoyed relaxed rules which permitted him to play for six seasons at Fairmount State College—now known as Wichita State University—before playing three additional seasons for Yale University.

References

Year of birth missing
Year of death missing
19th-century players of American football
American football guards
American football tackles
Beloit Buccaneers football coaches
Wichita State Shockers football players
Yale Bulldogs football players